The North Star Horizon was a popular 8-bit S-100 bus computer introduced in October 1977. Like most S-100 machines of the era, it was built around the Zilog Z80A microprocessor, and typically ran the CP/M operating system. It was produced by North Star Computers, and it could be purchased either in kit form or pre-assembled. The North Star Horizon was one of the first computers to have built in floppy drives  as well as being one of the first personal computers to have a hard disk drive.

Specifications
The computer consists of a thick aluminium chassis separated into left and right compartments with a plywood cover which sat on the top and draped over the left and right sides. (It is one of only a handful of computers to be sold in a wooden cabinet. Later versions featured an all-metal case which met safety standards.)  The rear section of the compartment on the right held a linear power supply, including a large transformer and power capacitors, comprising much of the bulk and weight of the system. The empty section in front of the power supply normally housed one or two floppy disk drives, placed on their side so the slots were vertical. The compartment on the left held the S-100 motherboard, rotated so the slots ran left-right. Although a few logic circuits were on the motherboard, primarily for I/O functions, both the processor and the memory resided in separate daughterboards.

Capable of running CP/M and NSDOS (North Star's proprietary Disk Operating System), a standard North Star system sported one or two hard-sectored 5.25 inch floppy disk drives and a serial interface to which one could connect a terminal to interact with it. NSDOS included North Star BASIC, a slightly non-standard dialect of BASIC, where some standard BASIC commands of the day had been changed, probably to avoid potential legal issues. Two examples of this were the EXAM and FILL commands, which took the place of the more common PEEK and POKE.

The Horizon was superseded by the all-in-one North Star Advantage in 1982. The Horizon found a niche in University environments where its inbuilt S-100 bus could be used to interface it to a variety of control systems.

North Star released a hard disk version, with an internal full height 5MB MFM drive. They also released an S-100 card with integrated memory and two serial ports which allowed up to eight users on one Horizon, each with their own CPU sharing the disk and other resources.  This operated under TurboDOS, a multi user CP/M variant with some Unix-like features.

References

External links
NorthStar Horizon at Obsolete Technology
NorthStar Horizon at Old Computer Museum
North Star Computers Manuals from  Harte Technologies
NorthStar documentation from Rich's classic computing lab

Early microcomputers
Computer-related introductions in 1977
S-100 machines